Tomasz Józef Sakiewicz (born 31 December 1967, in Warsaw) is a Polish activist, journalist, publicist, and the editor-in-chief of Gazeta Polska.

References

External links
Tomasz Sakiewicz' blog

1967 births
Living people
20th-century Polish journalists
21st-century Polish journalists
Writers from Warsaw